Antônio Callado (26 January 1917 – 28 January 1997) was a Brazilian journalist, playwright, and novelist. Born in Niterói, Rio de Janeiro, Callado studied law, then worked as a journalist in London for the BBC's Brazilian Service from 1941 to 1947. Callado began writing fiction in the 1950s. His first novel, A assunção de Salviano (The Assumption of Salviano), was published in 1954, and his last, O homem cordial e outras histórias (Men of Feeling and Other Stories), came out in 1993. Quarup (1967) is regarded as his most famous work. Callado has received literary prizes that include the Golfinho de Ouro, the Prêmio Brasília, and the Goethe Prize for fiction for Sempreviva (1981).  He died in Rio de Janeiro, aged 80.

Works
O fígado de Prometeu, play (1951)
A assunção de Salviano, novel (1954)
A cidade assassinada, play (1954)
Frankel, play (1955)
A madona de cedro, novel (1957)
Retrato de Portinari, biography (1957)
Pedro Mico, play (1957)
Colar de coral, play (1957)
O tesouro de Chica da Silva, play (1962)
Forró no Engenho Cananéia, play (1964)
Kuarup, novel (1967)
Bar Don Juan, novel (1971)
Reflexos do baile, novel (1976)
Sempreviva, novel (1981)
A expedição Montaigne, novel (1982)
A revolta da cachaça, play (1983)
Concerto carioca, novel (1985)
Memórias de Aldenham House, novel (1989)
O homem cordial e outras histórias, short stories (1993)

See also

Literature of Brazil
List of Brazilian writers

References

1917 births
1997 deaths
Brazilian male novelists
Brazilian journalists
20th-century Brazilian novelists
20th-century Brazilian male writers
20th-century journalists